Bayerbach is a municipality in the district of Landshut in Bavaria in Germany.

Geography 
It is located on the Bayerbacher Bach, a stream which issues into the Kleine Laber.

Subdivisions 
Bayerbach bei Ergoldsbach consists of 22 villages:

Neighbouring communities 
 Ergoldsbach
 Postau
 Weng
 Mengkofen (Dingolfing-Landau)
 Laberweinting (Straubing-Bogen)
 Mallersdorf-Pfaffenberg (Straubing-Bogen)

Main sights
Castle Peuerbach (15th century, rebuilt 1892/93)
Church of Mariä Himmelfahrt  (Neogothic building 1865/67)

Sons and daughters of Bayerbach bei Ergoldsbach
 Karl Bickleder (1888–1958), German politician (BVP and CSU), member of the Landtag of Bavaria.
 Anna Katharina Schaffelhuber (born 1993), German para-alpine skier

References

Landshut (district)